Martellidendron is a genus of flowering plants in the family Pandanaceae, native to the Seychelles and Madagascar. 
They resemble palms, but are not closely related to palms. The genus Martellidendron, was previously recognized as a section of the genus Pandanus in 1951 by Rodolfo Emilio Giuseppe Pichi-Sermolli, Then as a subgenus in 1974. It was finally separated out in 2003 on the basis of phylogenetic studies that used chloroplast DNA sequence data.

The genus name of Martellidendron is in honour of Ugolino Martelli (1860–1934), who was an Italian botanist, biologist, and mycologist, plus dendron the Greek word for "tree".

The genus was circumscribed by Martin Wilhelm Callmander and Philippe Chassot in Taxon vol.52 (Issue 4) on page 755-762 in 2003.

Morphology
Martellidendron plants are dioecious, that is, the male and female flower are on separate plants. The male flowers have many stamens (as many as 100), and grow in an inflorescence that consists of spikes surrounded by bracts. As the female flowers mature, they merge into an oblong or spherical multiple fruit. An individual fruit is a drupe with two chambers.

Species
Martellidendron comprises six species;
Martellidendron androcephalanthos (Martelli) Callm. & Chassot, Taxon 52: 756 (2003).
Martellidendron cruciatum (Pic.Serm.) Callm. & Chassot, Taxon 52: 756 (2003).
Martellidendron gallinarum (Callm.) Callm., Taxon 52: 756 (2003).
Martellidendron hornei (Balf.f.) Callm. & Chassot, Taxon 52: 756 (2003).
Martellidendron karaka (Martelli) Callm., Taxon 52: 756 (2003).
Martellidendron kariangense (Huynh) Callm., Taxon 52: 756 (2003).

References

External links
 Images Google

 
Pandanales genera